Y-75 Frankfurt airfield was a German military airport. It was where No. 665 Squadron RCAF maintained one aircraft section from May to July, 1945.

History 
Initially assigned to A-620 Reims, France, 'Irwin' section, 'B' Flight, No. 665 Squadron RCAF was stationed at Y-75 Frankfurt, Germany From 27 May 1945, to 1 July 1945. The section's primary role was to fly U.S. Intelligence officers from S.H.A.E.F. Headquarters to destinations across northwest Europe.

The section maintained one Taylorcraft Auster Mk. V aircraft, one jeep transport, one 60-cwt. mobile living quarters, and a radio network on the airfield. The section was seconded to Allied Headquarters (Hocht), and commanded by senior U.S. Intelligence (G-2) personnel under General Turner, U.S. Army. The section completed its tasking and vacated the duty station in the first week of July, 1945, later returning to 'Joe' airfield at Apeldoorn, the Netherlands for squadron disbanding.

References 

Royal Air Force stations in Germany
Airports in Hesse